Marion Lena Starkey (April 13, 1901 – December 18, 1991) was an American writer of history books, including The Devil in Massachusetts: A Modern Enquiry into the Salem Witch Trials.

Career
After working as a newspaper editor for the Saugus Herald and teaching at the Hampton Institute and at the University of Connecticut at New London, she became a full-time writer. She began writing as a child, but did not take up writing full-time for many years. Her books include: The Tall Man from Boston, The Visionary Girls: Witchcraft in Salem Village, Cherokee Nation, The Devil in Massachusetts: A Modern Inquiry into the Salem Witch Trials, Land Where Our Fathers Died, Striving to Make It My Home, Congregational Way and The First Plantation: A History of Hampton and Elizabeth City County, Virginia, 1607-1887.

The Devil in Massachusetts
Motivated in part by the question of how the Holocaust could have happened, Starkey delved into the Salem archives to explore the underpinnings of an earlier, American tragedy: the Salem Witch Trials. Working from court records, she created a psychological portrait tracing the development of the event from child fantasies to societal hysteria, eventually publishing in 1949 The Devil in Massachusetts: A Modern Enquiry Into the Salem Witch Trials. Arthur Miller is said to have used this work in his research for The Crucible.

References

External links
 

1901 births
1991 deaths
People from Saugus, Massachusetts
American women historians
American women journalists
20th-century American women writers
20th-century American historians
Historians from Massachusetts
20th-century American journalists
Journalists from Massachusetts
Hampton University faculty